Juan-Carlos Elizondo (born 2 October 1975) is a Mexican alpine skier. He competed in the men's slalom at the 1992 Winter Olympics.

References

1975 births
Living people
Mexican male alpine skiers
Olympic alpine skiers of Mexico
Alpine skiers at the 1992 Winter Olympics
Place of birth missing (living people)